Mark Yakovlevich Bloch (16 August 1924 – 16 September 2022) was a Soviet and Russian linguist, Doctor of Philology, Professor, Head of the English Language Grammar Department of the Moscow Pedagogical State University, Head of the Foreign Languages Department of the Moscow Humanitarian and Technical Academy, Honorary Professor of MPGU, Honorary Academician of the Russian Academy of Natural Sciences, Honorary Academician of the International Academy of Sciences of Pedagogical Education, member of the Writers' Union of Russia, member of the Russian Union of Journalists, and the Russian Writers’ Club of New York. He was the author of a number of literary works under the literary pseudonym of Mark Lensky.

Bloch’s main fields of research included English language theory, general, typological and German linguistics, translation theory, and linguodidactics. He wrote over 200 scientific works, including the monographs "Theoretical English Grammar" and "The Theoretical Bases of Grammar". Bloсh has also founded a scientific school of communicative-paradigmatic linguistics. Bloch introduced the concept of "dictema" into grammar as an elementary situational-thematic unit of the text.

References 

1924 births
2022 deaths
Linguists from the Soviet Union
Linguists from Russia
20th-century linguists
Grammarians from Russia
Linguists of Russian
Academic staff of Moscow State Pedagogical University
Russian people of Ukrainian descent
Writers from Kyiv